Baltasar Elisio de Medinilla (28 June 1585 – 30 August 1620) was a Spanish poet and friend of the playwright Lope de Vega. He was born and died in Toledo.

Works

Poems
 Limpia Concepción de la Virgen Nuestra Señora, Madrid 1617, 2. ibd. 1618
 Algunas obras divinas, manuscrito, BNM 3954 
 Descripción de Buenavista, manuscrito, 1. BNM 3954, 2. BNM 4266

Prose 
 A la imperial ciudad de Toledo, 1618
 A Lope de Vega Carpio en la muerte de Carlos Félix, su hijo, consolación, BNM, 4266
 El Vega. De la Poética Española. Dialogo literario, BNM, 4266
 A los aficionados a los escritos de Lope de Vega Carpio, prólogo de Jerusalén conquistada, Madrid, Juan de la Cuesta, 1609

Sources
Madroñal Durán, Abraham: Baltasar Elisio de Medinilla y la poesía Toledana de principios del Siglo XVII. Con la edición de sus "Obras divinas", Vervuert, 1999, 

16th-century Spanish poets
16th-century male writers
17th-century Spanish poets
1585 births
1620 deaths
People from Toledo, Spain